Rudy "Tutti" Grayzell (June 8, 1933 - November 26, 2019), also known as Rudy Gray, was a Rockabilly musician.

He was born Rudolph Paiz Jimenez in Saspamco, Texas, and took his stage-name from his German great-grandmother. He first formed "The Buckles", which became "Texas Kool Kats" and a popular local group. He also had a daily radio show in 1957. These groups were country-oriented, but he moved toward a more rockabilly sound with "Let's Get Wild" or "Duck Tail." In the 1950s he toured with Elvis Presley, who came up with his nickname, suggesting he should have recorded ”Tutti Frutti”. He is an inductee of the Rockabilly Hall of Fame.

His chief mainstream contribution has been as "celebrity spokesman" for Pine Brothers Softish Throat Drops, sporting a wild pompadour wig, much jewelry and a pasted-on thatch of chest hair.

References 

American musicians of Mexican descent
Musicians from Texas
Abbott Records artists
Starday Records artists
1933 births
2019 deaths
People from Wilson County, Texas
Hispanic and Latino American musicians